Patrice Désilets (born 9 May 1974) is a Canadian game designer best known for creating the Assassin's Creed series. He served as creative director for three of the most critically acclaimed titles within the franchise to date: Assassin's Creed, Assassin's Creed II, and Assassin's Creed: Brotherhood. He is also known for being the director of Ubisoft's Prince of Persia: The Sands of Time. In 2014, he founded the Montreal-based indie studio Panache Digital Games, where he worked on the game Ancestors: The Humankind Odyssey.

Biography
Born in 1974 at Saint-Jean-sur-Richelieu, Quebec, Désilets is the son of Jacques Désilets, mathematician and director of CEGEP, and Luce de Bellefeuille, Director General of the Secretariat for International Adoption. In 1996, Désilets earned his bachelor's degree in film studies and literature at University of Montreal, to which time prior, he was enrolled at the Collège Édouard-Montpetit. Coming from a background in film, he has used his creative vision to shape games in which he has taken a creative lead including 2007's Assassin's Creed and its 2009 sequel Assassin's Creed II. Désilets other credits include Assassin's Creed: Brotherhood, Prince of Persia: The Sands of Time, Disney's Donald Duck: Goin' Quackers, and Hype: The Time Quest.

Departure from Ubisoft  
Désilets left Ubisoft in June 2010, which was confirmed by the company on June 13, 2010, looking for more creative independence. After one year away from the gaming industry, Patrice Désilets officially returned by joining THQ as Creative Director at their new Montreal based studio in June 2011. For two years at THQ Montreal, Désilets was working on a new project titled 1666 Amsterdam, leading a team of close to fifty people.

THQ declared bankruptcy under Chapter 11 in the United States in December 2012; in January 2013, THQ Montreal was sold off to Ubisoft in an auction. Désilets was subsequently let go by Ubisoft on May 7, 2013, when the two parties could not agree on the contract terms. When asked about it, Désilets said, "Contrary to any statements made earlier today, this morning I was terminated by Ubisoft. I was notified of this termination in person, handed a termination notice and was unceremoniously escorted out of the building by two guards without being able to say goodbye to my team or collect my personal belongings. This was not my decision. Ubisoft's actions are baseless and without merit. I intend to fight Ubisoft vigorously for my rights, for my team and for my game."

Following this, Désilets and Ubisoft came to an agreement in April 2016 in which Désilets won back all creative rights to 1666 Amsterdam.

Panache Digital Games 
On December 14, 2014, Désilets and his team launched a new game development studio in Montreal, Panache Digital Games, where they are working on their first project titled Ancestors: The Humankind Odyssey.

Works 
Hype: The Time Quest (1999)
Donald Duck: Goin' Quackers (2000)
Prince of Persia: The Sands of Time (2003)
Assassin's Creed (2007)
Assassin's Creed II (2009)
Assassin's Creed: Brotherhood (2010)
 Ancestors: The Humankind Odyssey (2019)

References

1974 births
Living people
People from Saint-Jean-sur-Richelieu
Canadian video game designers
Ubisoft people